Confessionalism is a system of government that is a de jure mix of religion and politics. It typically entails distributing political and institutional power proportionally among confessional communities.

Debate
Proponents of confessionalism cite it as an effective way to secure the peaceful co-existence of diverse religious and ethnic communities by empowering each according to its "weight" in the region. However, critics point out that such a system may actually deepen conflict between ethnic groups. They argue that whichever group holds the most political power may use government to favour itself at the expense of other groups, or even to oppress rival groups. Also, as demographics change, the positions and power held by a particular group may no longer appropriately reflect the size of that group.

Debate over confessionalism raises similar issues to those facing consociationalism, of which confessionalism is one kind.

Iraq

Following the invasion of Iraq in 2003, the occupying administration introduced a system where power was shared between the three main ethno-religious groups: Shia Muslim Arabs, Sunni Muslim Arabs and Kurds.

The constitution of Iraq encouraged such power-sharing, due to the parliamentary system and the initial requirement for a super-majority to elect the President. Although not explicitly required in the constitution, political tradition has continued to date for the President to be a Kurd, the Speaker of Parliament a Sunni  Muslim Arab and the Prime Minister a Shi'ite Muslim Arab.

Lebanon

The repartition of assembly seats on a confessional basis in the Middle East was invented by the Ottoman Empire (e.g. in the Ottoman Parliament) and continued in several post-Ottoman countries with reserved seats for non-Muslim, namely Christian, minorities (Syria, Jordan, Iraq), or for all religious communities including Muslim subgroups and Christian churches (Lebanon). A similar system prevails in Iran for the Armenian, Assyrian, Jewish and Zoroastrian minorities.

Although it was meant to be a temporary solution "until such time as the Chamber enacts new electoral laws on a non-confessional basis", more than eighty years later, confessionalism remains the system of government implemented in Lebanon.  All posts in government and seats in the legislature are apportioned amongst different religious groups according to a political agreement, as the relative demographic weight of those groups is unknown. The constitution of 1926, amended after the Taif Agreement of 1990 and the Doha agreement of 2008 specified that there should be 54 Christian deputies and 54 Muslim deputies, even though in practice there are 64 deputies each.  In addition, within those two groups, seats should be shared according to the demographic weight of each community.

The Lebanese constitution also guarantees  segmental autonomy to 18 recognized communities in the country in domains such as education. Lebanon also presents other characteristics of confessionalism. Since 2005 Lebanese politics has been polarized around two trans-religious coalitions with the majority never able to govern alone. There is, however, another section of the constitution that addresses the development of outside parties not represented by popular support.

In Lebanon, the concept of confessionalism holds an important political meaning, since political power and governmental bureaucracy are organized according to religious confessions (as it happened in Switzerland, Germany, the Netherlands and other countries before). For example, the National Pact (an unwritten covenant) and later the Taif Agreement provide for a Maronite Christian president, a Sunni Muslim prime minister, and a Shia Muslim speaker of parliament. This is an example of political confessionalism.

Netherlands

In the politics of the Netherlands the term "confessionalism" refers to any political ideology based on religion.  A traditional norm in society, extending to many facets of cultural life, termed pillarisation.

Dutch parties usually labelled as confessionalist are the Christian Union and the Reformed Political Party, both exclusively Protestant. Less often seen as confessionalist is the Christian Democratic Appeal which has also several Muslims among its elected officials, and does not make mention of God in their stated core principles or their 2012 election platform, only mentioning their Christian roots.

There are also minor Dutch Muslim parties, e.g. the ) that has many common programmatical aims with the Christian Union and the local (The Hague) party Islam Democrats. In January 2008, the creation of an Islamic Democratic Party was announced, but it appeared after a few days it was a hoax, its programme was actually an adapted copy of the programme of the Protestant fundamentalist Reformed Political Party. The only Muslim parties with political representation in the Netherlands are NIDA with 2 seats in Rotterdam and 1 seat in The Hague. Other Muslim parties are Islam Democrats and its splinter group Party of Unity, each with one councillor in The Hague municipal council.

Prohibition

Bulgaria 
Bulgaria’s Constitution prohibits religious political parties. Article 11, Clause 4, states: “There shall be no political parties on ethnic, racial or religious lines, nor parties which seek the violent seizure of state power.”

Portugal 
In Portugal, confessionalist political parties are forbidden by the Constitution. Article 51, Clause 3, of the Constitution states: “Without prejudice to the philosophy or ideology that underlies their manifestoes, political parties may not employ names that contain expressions which are directly related to any religion or church, or emblems that can be confused with national or religious symbols.”

Turkey

See also
Consociationalism
Multiconfessionalism
Secularism
Laïcité

References

Political science terminology
Political systems
Politics of Lebanon
Power sharing
Confessionalism